Ketneri is a small village in southern Estonia. It is situated in Nõo Municipality,  Tartu County.

As of January 1, 2005, the village's population was 14 and it counted 7 active households.

There are many tourist locations around the village, like Otepää Nature Park, Vitipalu Watch Tower and a forest with various rare species.

References

Villages in Tartu County